The 2010–11 DFB-Pokal was the 68th season of the annual German football cup competition. The competition began on 13 August 2010 with the first round and concluded on 21 May 2011 with the final at the Olympiastadion in Berlin. The competition was won by Schalke 04, who eliminated title holder Bayern Munich in the semi-finals. By clinching the cup, Schalke thus qualified for the play-off round of the 2011–12 UEFA Europa League.

Participating clubs
The following 64 teams competed in the first round:

Draw
The draws for the different rounds are conducted as following: For the first round, the participating teams will be split into two pots. The first pot contains all teams which have qualified through their regional cup competitions, the best four teams of the 3rd Liga and the bottom four teams of the Second Bundesliga. Every team from this pot will be drawn to a team from the second pot, which contains all remaining professional teams. The teams from the first pot will be set as the home team in the process.

The two-pot scenario will also be applied for the second round, with the remaining 3rd Liga/amateur teams in the first pot and the remaining professional teams in the other pot. Once one pot is empty, the remaining pairings will be drawn from the other pot with the first-drawn team for a match serving as hosts. For the remaining rounds, the draw will be conducted from just one pot. Any remaining 3rd Liga/amateur team will be the home team if drawn against a professional team. In every other case, the first-drawn team will serve as hosts.

Matches

First round
The draw for this round took place on 5 June 2010. The matches were played on 13–16 August 2010.

As usual, a small number of non-Bundesliga clubs had to play their home matches at different locations than their usual home grounds. Most notably, Hallescher FC had to move their tie against Union Berlin to Red Bull Arena at nearby Leipzig because their own Kurt-Wabbel-Stadion was rebuilt at that time. Other clubs which had their matches transferred to different locations included SV Sandhausen (to Carl-Benz-Stadion at Mannheim) and Germania Windeck (to RheinEnergieStadion at Cologne).

All times CEST

Second round
The draw for this round took place on 21 August 2010. The matches were played on 26–27 October 2010.

As in the first round, and for the same reasons, Hallescher FC played at Red Bull Arena, Leipzig. Additionally, Victoria Hamburg moved their tie against VfL Wolfsburg to Millerntor-Stadion due to insufficient lighting for TV broadcasts at their usual venue, Stadion Hoheluft.

All times CEST

Round of 16
The draw for this round took place on 31 October 2010. Six matches took place on 21–22 December 2010; the ties Offenbach–Nürnberg and Koblenz–Kaiserslautern, originally scheduled for 21 December, have been postponed to mid-January because of inclement weather.

All times CET

Quarter-finals
The draw for this round took place on 22 December 2010. The matches will be played on 25–26 January 2011.

All times CET

Semi-finals
The draw for this round took place on 30 January 2011. The matches will be played on 1 and 2 March 2011.

All times CET

Final

For the first time since 2004, a 2. Bundesliga club reached the final.

References

External links
 
DFB-Pokal on kicker.de 

2010–11
2010–11 in German football cups